The Simpsons is an American animated sitcom created by Matt Groening for the Fox Broadcasting Company. It is a satirical depiction of a dysfunctional middle-class American lifestyle starring the eponymous family: Homer, Marge, Bart, Lisa, and Maggie. Set in the town of Springfield, the show lampoons both American culture and the human condition. The family was conceived by Groening shortly before a pitch for a series of animated shorts with producer James L. Brooks. Groening named each character (other than Bart) after members of his own family. The shorts became part of the Fox series The Tracey Ullman Show on April 19, 1987. After a three-season run, the sketch was developed into a half-hour prime-time hit show.

From the series debut on December 17, 1989, to May 17, 2009, The Simpsons had broadcast its first 441 episodes, to the end of the twentieth season. The show holds several American television longevity records. It is the longest-running prime-time animated series and longest-running sitcom in the United States. On April 28, 1994, The Simpsons reached its 100th episode in the fifth season. With its twentieth season (2008–09), the series tied Gunsmoke in seasons as the longest-running American prime-time scripted television series, and surpassed Gunsmoke in this record with the twenty-first season premiere on September 27, 2009.

Episodes of The Simpsons have won dozens of awards, including 31 Emmys (ten for Outstanding Animated Program), 30 Annies, and a Peabody. The Simpsons Movie, a feature-length film, was released in theaters worldwide on July 26 and 27, 2007 and grossed US$526.2 million worldwide. The first twenty seasons are available on DVD in regions 1, 2, and 4, with the twentieth season released on both DVD and Blu-ray in 2010 to celebrate the 20th anniversary of the series. On April 8, 2015, showrunner Al Jean announced that there would be no more DVD or Blu-ray releases, shifting focus to digital distribution, although this was later reversed on July 22, 2017. Almost two years later, on July 20, 2019, it was announced that Season 19 would be released on December 3, 2019, on DVD.

On April 26, 1998, The Simpsons reached its 200th episode in its ninth season, its 300th episode on February 2, 2003, in the fourteenth season, and its 400th episode in the eighteenth season on May 20, 2007, which is also the last episode of the series to air before the release of The Simpsons Movie.

Series overview

Episodes

Season 1 (1989–90)

Season 2 (1990–91)

Season 3 (1991–92)
Note: This is the last season to be entirely animated by Klasky Csupo.

Season 4 (1992–93)
Note: From "Homer the Heretic" to season 28's "Havana Wild Weekend", the series animated by Film Roman.

Season 5 (1993–94)

Season 6 (1994–95)

Season 7 (1995–96)

Season 8 (1996–97)

Season 9 (1997–98)

Season 10 (1998–99)

Season 11 (1999–2000)

Season 12 (2000–01)

Season 13 (2001–02)
Note: This is the last season to entirely use cel animation.

Season 14 (2002–03)
Note: From "The Great Louse Detective" onward, digital ink and paint are used for episodes.

Season 15 (2003–04)

Season 16 (2004–05)

Season 17 (2005–06)

Season 18 (2006–07)

The Simpsons Movie (2007)

Season 19 (2007–08)
Note: This is the last season to air entirely in standard definition.

Season 20 (2008–09)
Note: Beginning with "Take My Life, Please", the series is presented in high definition.

See also

The Simpsons shorts
"The Simpsons Guy" – a crossover episode of Family Guy

Notes

References

1980s television-related lists
1990s television-related lists
2000s television-related lists

Episodes from seasons 1-20
Lists of American adult animated television series episodes
Lists of American sitcom episodes